Nikolas Panayiotou (born 12 May 2000) is a Cypriot footballer who plays as a centre-back for Omonia and the Cyprus national team.

Club career 
Having come through Anorthosis' academy, Panayiotou was promoted to their first team in April 2019. In July, he joined Omonia on a three-year contract, which he would later renew for another three years.

On 6 October 2022, Panayiotou scored his first goal for Omonia, in a 2–3 home defeat to Manchester United, in the Europa League. This made him Omonia's 101st player to score in a European competition, setting a new record for a Cypriot club's number of European scorers.

International career 
He made his debut for the Cyprus national football team on 1 September 2021 in a World Cup qualifier against Malta, a 0–3 away loss. He substituted Fotis Papoulis in the 59th minute.

Club Statistics

Honours
Omonia
Cypriot First Division: 2020–21
Cypriot Cup: 2021–22
Cypriot Super Cup: 2021

References

External links
Νικόλας Παναγιώτου
Nikolas Panayiotou - Cyprus - U19 EURO
Κυπριακή Ομοσπονδία Ποδοσφαίρου - Επίσημη Ιστοσελίδα

2000 births
Living people
Cypriot footballers
Cyprus youth international footballers
Cyprus under-21 international footballers
Cyprus international footballers
Association football midfielders
Anorthosis Famagusta F.C. players
AC Omonia players
Cypriot First Division players